Ahmad Mohammad Bahar (born 1949) is the first deputy speaker of the Palestinian Legislative Council (PLC) since his election to that post on 18 January 2006. Born in Gaza City, he was a professor at the Islamic University of Gaza.

In 2012, he delivered a televised sermon in which he prayed for Allah to kill "the Jews and their supporters... [and] the Americans and their supporters... without leaving a single one". This statement has been characterized as incitement to genocide.

See also
 Aziz Dweik
 Khalil al-Hayya

References 

Members of the 2006 Palestinian Legislative Council
Speakers of the Palestinian Legislative Council
Islamic University of Gaza alumni
1949 births
Hamas members
Living people
Palestinian people imprisoned by Israel
People from Gaza City